A list of the films produced in Mexico in 1947 (see 1947 in film):

1947

External links

1947
Films
Mexican